Ladyfest UK 2001 was a various artists compilation CD released to coincide with the 2001 UK Ladyfest event in Glasgow.

Track listing
 Katastrophy Wife - "Gone Away"
 Angelica - "Velveteen Dreams (Demo Version)"
 Electrelane - "Spartakade"
 Bis - "The End Starts Today"
 Fake - "Cinnamon Gum"
 Gertrude - "She Would Like To Be"
 Akira - "Frankie T"
 Pro Forma - "Cracked Machine"
 Life Without Buildings - "The Leanover (Original 7" version)"
 Kirby - "Star Cafe"
 Angelica - "Saturn (Demo Version)"
 Katastrophy Wife - "Poison (Acoustic Version)"

External links

References

Music festival compilation albums
2001 live albums
2001 compilation albums